Tufts University is a private research university in Medford and Somerville, Massachusetts. It was founded in 1852 as Tufts College by Christian universalists who sought to provide a nonsectarian institution of higher learning. Tufts remained a small liberal arts college until the 1970s, when it transformed into a large research university offering several doctorates. It is classified among "R1: Doctoral Universities – Very high research activity" and is a member of the Association of American Universities, which emphasizes strong academic research.

Tufts offers over 90 undergraduate and 160 graduate programs across ten schools in the greater Boston area and Talloires, France. It has the country's oldest graduate school of international relations, the Fletcher School of Law and Diplomacy. The largest school is the School of Arts and Sciences, which includes both the Graduate School of Arts and Sciences and the School of the Museum of Fine Arts at Tufts University, which is affiliated with the Museum of Fine Arts, Boston. The School of Engineering offers an entrepreneurial focus through its Gordon Institute and maintains close connections with the original college.

Tufts has a campus in Downtown Boston that houses the medical, dental, and nutrition schools and the Graduate School of Biomedical Sciences, affiliated with several medical centers in the area. Several programs are affiliated with nearby Harvard University and the Massachusetts Institute of Technology, and joint undergraduate degree programs are offered with the New England Conservatory, the College of Europe, and Sciences Po Paris. Other programs are associated with the University of Paris, University of Oxford, London School of Economics, and constituents of the University of London.

Tufts alumni and affiliates include ten Nobel Prize laureates, twelve Pulitzer Prize winners, five state governors, two U.S. Senators, four Emmy Award winners, three Academy Award winners, and National Academy members. Tufts has also graduated four Rhodes Scholars, five Marshall Scholars, five Truman Scholars, and five Goldwater scholars.

History

19th century

In the 1840s, the Universalist Church wanted to open a college in New England, and Charles Tufts donated 20 acres to the church in 1852 to help them achieve this goal. Charles Tufts had inherited the land, a barren hill which was one of the highest points in the Boston area, called Walnut Hill, and when asked by a family member what he intended to do with the land, he said "I will put a light on it." His 20-acre donation (then valued at $20,000) is still at the heart of Tufts' now-150-acre campus, straddling Somerville and Medford. It was also in 1852 that the Commonwealth of Massachusetts chartered Tufts College, noting the college should promote "virtue and piety and learning in such of the languages and liberal and useful arts as shall be recommended." During his tenure, Hosea Ballou spent a year travelling and studying in the United Kingdom. The methods of instruction which he initiated were based on the tutorials that were conducted in the University of Oxford and the University of Edinburgh. Now more than 160 years old, Tufts is the third-oldest college in the Boston area.

Having been one of the biggest influences in the establishment of the college, Hosea Ballou II became the first president in 1853, and College Hall, the first building on campus, was completed the following year. That building now bears Ballou's name. The campus opened in August 1854. President Ballou died in 1861 and was succeeded by Alonzo Ames Miner. Though not a college graduate, his presidency was marked by several advances. These include the establishment of preparatory schools for Tufts which include Goddard Seminary, Westbrook Seminary, and Dean Academy. During the Civil War the college actively supported the Union cause. The mansion of Major George L. Stearns which stood on part of the campus was a station on the Underground Railroad. In addition to having the largest classes spring up, 63 graduates served in the Union army. The first course of a three-year program leading to a degree in civil engineering was established in 1865, the same year MIT was founded. By 1869, the Crane Theological School was organized.

Miner's successor, Elmer Capen was the first president to be a Tufts alumnus. During his time, one of the earliest innovators was Amos Dolbear. In 1875, as chair of the physics department, he installed a working telephone which connected his lab in Ballou Hall to his home on Professors Row. Two years later Alexander Graham Bell would receive the patent. Dolbear's work in Tufts was later continued by Marconi and Tesla. Other famous scholars include William Leslie Hooper who in addition to serving as acting president, designed the first slotted armature for dynamos. His student at the college, Frederick Stark Pearson, would eventually become one of America's pioneers of the electrical power industry. He became responsible for the development of the electric power and electric streetcar systems which many cities in South America and Europe used. Another notable figure is Stephen M. Babcock who developed the first practical test to determine the amount of butterfat in milk. Since its development in the college, the Babcock Test has hardly been modified. Expansion of the chemistry and biology departments were largely led by scholars Arthur Michael, who was one of the first organic chemists in the U.S., and John Sterling Kingsley, who was one of the first scholars of comparative anatomy.

P. T. Barnum was one of the earliest benefactors of Tufts College, and the Barnum Museum of Natural History (Barnum Hall) was constructed in 1884 with funds donated by him to house his collection of animal specimens and the stuffed hide of Jumbo the elephant, who would become the university's mascot. The building stood until April 14, 1975, when fire gutted Barnum Hall, destroying the entire collection.

On July 15, 1892, the Tufts Board of Trustees voted "that the College be opened to women in the undergraduate departments on the same terms and conditions as men." Metcalf Hall opened in 1893 and served as the dormitory for women. At the same meeting, the trustees voted to create a graduate school faculty and to offer the PhD degree in biology and chemistry. In 1893 the Medical School opened and in 1899 the Boston Dental College was integrated into the university. In 1890, the Department of Electrical Engineering was created, and in 1892–1893 the course of three-year program in civil engineering was extended to four years. With the advent of the four-year program the degrees granted were bachelor of civil or electrical engineering. Tufts College added the Department of Mechanical Engineering and the Department of Chemical Engineering in 1894 and 1898, respectively. In 1898, the trustees voted to formally establish an undergraduate College of Engineering.

20th century

The Jackson College for Women was established in 1910 as a coordinate college adjacent to the Tufts campus. In 1980 it was integrated with the College of Liberal Arts but is still recognized in the formal name of the undergraduate arts and sciences division, the "College of Liberal Arts and Jackson College". Undergraduate women in arts and sciences continued to receive their diplomas from Jackson College until 2002.

Tufts expanded in 1933 with the opening of the Fletcher School of Law and Diplomacy, the first graduate school of international affairs in the United States. The Fletcher School began as a joint effort between Tufts and Harvard University, funded by an endowment from longtime Tufts benefactor and alumnus Austin Barclay Fletcher. Tufts assumed full administration of the Fletcher School in 1935, and strong linkages between the two schools remain.

During World War II, Tufts College was one of 131 colleges and universities nationally that took part in the V-12 Navy College Training Program which offered students a path to a Navy commission.

Due to travel restrictions imposed by World War II, the Boston Red Sox conducted spring training for the 1943 Major League season at Tufts College. In 1955, continued expansion was reflected in the change of the school's name to Tufts University.

The university experienced some growth during the presidency of Jean Mayer (1976–1992). Mayer established Tufts' veterinary, nutrition, and biomedical schools and acquired the Grafton and Talloires campuses, at the same time lifting the university out of its dire financial situation by increasing the size of the endowment by a factor of 15.

The College of Engineering added graduate study to its curriculum beginning in 1961, with master's degrees available in four departments. It added PhD programs in mechanical engineering in 1963, electrical engineering in 1964, engineering design in 1981, and civil engineering in 1985. In 1984 CEO and chairman of Analogic Corporation and NeuroLogica Corporation Bernard Marshall Gordon founded the Tufts Gordon Institute as the first educational institution created to foster entrepreneurship in the engineering fields. In 1991 the New England Association of Schools and Colleges accredited the institute to confer the degree of Master of Science in Engineering Management and in 1992 the Gordon Institute became part of the College of Engineering. In 1999, the College of Engineering became the School of Engineering, when oversight of graduate engineering programs was transferred from the Graduate School of Arts and Sciences. As part of the same reorganization the Faculty of Arts and Science became the Faculty of Arts, Sciences, and Engineering (AS&E).

21st century

Under President Larry Bacow, Tufts started a capital campaign in 2006 with the goal of raising $1.2 billion to implement full need-blind admission by 2011.  the campaign raised $1.14 billion. Tufts received the largest donations in its history since 2005, including a $136 million bequest to its endowment upon the dissolution of a charitable trust set up by 1911 alumnus Frank C. Doble, a $100 million gift from eBay founder Pierre Omidyar to establish the Omidyar-Tufts Microfinance Fund, and a number of $40 million-plus gifts to specific schools.

In 2008, Hines Interests and TUDC, a subsidiary of the university, planned to break ground on the South Station Tower. Tufts had acquired the air rights from South Station in 1990, with former President Jean Meyer envisioning a tower that would be the center of medical research. Preliminary design was done by Cesar Pelli, with construction scheduled to start in 2017.  However, Tufts withdrew from the project in 2009.

On November 30, 2010, the university announced that Anthony P. Monaco, formerly of Oxford University, would become its thirteenth president. Monaco's inauguration took place on October 21, 2011. 

As of October 15, 2015, Computer Science surpassed International Relations as the largest major at the university, with 466 declared majors.

On December 22, 2015, the university announced that it would acquire the School of the Museum of Fine Arts. The merger was completed on June 30, 2016. One of the key figures in the merger, Nancy Bauer, became the dean of the museum school.

In December 2015, the university completed a reconstruction of the Memorial Stairs. A new Central Energy Plant was under construction and set to finish in the summer of 2016. It will replace an aging 60-year-old plant and provide new efficiency boilers which in addition to providing the university directly with electricity, heated and chilled water, will help the university cut emissions. The university also completed construction of the Science and Engineering Complex (SEC) in 2017. The SEC features laboratories and fosters interdisciplinary research between the neuroscience and environmental science departments. The SEC joins the newly rehabilitated 574 Boston Avenue in the expansion of classroom and laboratory facilities for the engineering school. In the spring of 2022, the university plans to open the newly constructed Joyce Cummings Center, an interdisciplinary academic building which will house the computer science and economics departments, among others.

In 2016, Microsoft co-founder Paul Allen pledged a $10 million donation over four years for the creation of the Allen Discovery Centers at Tufts and Stanford. The centers would fund research that would read and write the morphogenetic code. Tufts biologist Michael Levin will lead the center with research focusing on communications between cells and the causation of birth defects, cancer, traumatic injuries and degenerative diseases.

On January 2, 2020, Tufts announced that it would pay the MBTA $2 million over 10 years to rename the adjacent Green Line Extension station from "College Avenue" to "." The Medford Branch opened to Medford/Tufts on December 12, 2022.

After a service of twelve years as president, Anthony Monaco announced his retirement effective in 2023. On November 17, 2022, the university announced that Sunil Kumar, currently the provost of Johns Hopkins University, will become the university's 14th president on July 1, 2023.

Campuses

Medford and Somerville

This campus houses all undergraduates in Arts & Sciences and Engineering, the graduate programs at The Fletcher School of Law and Diplomacy and all of the graduate programs in Arts & Sciences and Engineering. While the majority of the campus is in Medford, the Somerville line intersects it, placing parts of the lower campus in Somerville and leading to the common terms "Uphill" and "Downhill".

The "Uphill" portion of the campus comprises the academic and the residential "Rez" quad (built on the former reservoir site) and is enclosed by a wrought-iron fence. Classes that contributed to the building of the fence are commemorated along its length. The academic quad contains the earliest buildings and was primarily built from the middle of the 19th century to the beginning of the 20th century. One of Tufts' first buildings, Ballou Hall was constructed from 1852 to 1854 and was designed in the Italianate style by the well-known Boston architect Gridley James Fox Bryant. Ballou Hall was later restored by McKim, Mead, and White in 1955–56, and houses the offices of the president, the provost, and several vice presidents and deans. Other notable buildings include: Packard Hall (1856), East Hall (1860), West Hall (1871), Goddard Chapel (1882), Goddard Hall (1883), Barnum Hall (1884), and Eaton Hall (1908). The New York firm Whitfield & King was responsible for the design of Eaton Hall.

The "Uphill" residential quad contains more modern buildings. The most notable building is Carmichael Hall (1954), designed by Arland A. Dirlam. Dirlam also designed Bendetson Hall (1947) on the academic quad. Adjacent to both quads is the Cabot Intercultural Center designed by ARC/Architectural Resources Cambridge, Inc. one of the Fletcher School's buildings. Many points on the hill have noted views of the Boston skyline, particularly the patio on the Tisch Library roof. It has been ranked one of the prettiest college campuses in the United States.

The "Uphill" portion can be accessed with the memorial stairs. Designed by the Olmsted Brothers in the 1920s, the memorial stairs form one of the main entrances to the university and allows direct access to the engineering school from the academic quad. The engineering school is part of the Tufts's "Downhill" portion of campus.  Notable buildings around the engineering school include Bromfield-Pearson Hall (1893), Robinson Hall (1899), and Curtis Hall (1894).  Boston architect George Albert Clough is responsible for the design of Curtis Hall and Goddard Hall. Additionally, Arland Dirlam is responsible for the designs of many buildings downhill. These include Cohen Auditorium (1950), Hodgdon Hall (1954), and Jackson Gymnasium (1947). Other notable buildings downhill include the Mayer Campus Center and the Dewick Macphie Dining Hall. Administrative offices also occupy the surrounding neighborhoods and nearby Davis Square, where Tufts makes payments in lieu of taxes on some of its tax-exempt (educational) properties.

Boston
The School of Medicine, Graduate School of Biomedical Sciences, School of Dental Medicine, and the Friedman School of Nutrition Science and Policy are located on the Tufts Boston Health Science campus in the Chinatown neighborhood of Boston, adjacent to Tufts Medical Center, a 451-bed academic medical institution. All full-time Tufts Medical Center physicians hold clinical faculty appointments at Tufts School of Medicine.

The School of the Museum of Fine Arts at Tufts University (SMFA) is located on the Tufts Boston Fine Arts campus in the Fenway neighborhood of Boston, next door to the Museum of Fine Arts, Boston and the Isabella Stewart Gardner Museum. The late-2022 opening of the Green Line Extension of the MBTA Green Line E branch light rail transit route offers a one-seat direct connection between the SMFA and the main campus of Tufts University in Medford.

Grafton
The Cummings School of Veterinary Medicine is located in Grafton, Massachusetts, west of Boston, on a  campus. The school also maintains the Ambulatory Farm Clinic in Woodstock, Connecticut and the Tufts Laboratory at the Marine Biological Laboratory at Woods Hole on Cape Cod.

Talloires

Tufts has a satellite campus in Talloires, France at the Tufts European Center, a former Benedictine priory built in the 11th century. The priory was purchased in 1958 by Donald MacJannet and his wife Charlotte and used as a summer camp site for several years before the MacJannets gave the campus to Tufts in 1978. 

Each year the center hosts a number of summer study programs, and enrolled students live with local families. The Tufts Summit Program is for American high school students during the month of July. Tufts in Talloires is a 6-week program for Tufts undergraduates that extends from the middle of May until the end of June. Additionally, Tufts in Annecy is a 4-week program which provides French language learners a chance to practice and learn the language. The site is frequently the host of international conferences and summits, most notably the Talloires Declaration which united 22 universities toward a goal of sustainability. The Talloires campus has been ranked as one of the best branch campuses by the National Association of Branch Campus Administrators.

Organization and administration

Tufts University is an independent, privately supported, nonsectarian institution of higher education. Its official corporate name is The Trustees of Tufts College. The university is governed by up to forty-one trustees and no fewer than twenty-eight. The board is self-perpetuating with trustees responsible for choosing their successors. In addition to the president, the university appoints Charter Trustees (up to 30 members) who are elected by the board and Alumni Trustees (up to 10 members) who serve for up to five years. Generally, Charter Trustees are elected by majority vote of the members and Alumni Trustees are elected by alumni. The officers of the corporation include the Chair of the Board, three Vice Chairs, the Treasurer, the Secretary, the Provost, the President, who serves ex officio, and the Executive Vice President.

The President of Tufts University, who is elected by the trustees is the chief executive officer of the university. Assisting the president in administering the university are the Provost, the Executive Vice President, the Treasurer, and the Secretary, all of whom are appointed by the trustees on the nomination of the president and serve at their pleasure. The 13th president, Anthony Monaco, was sworn on August 1, 2011.

Tufts is organized into ten schools. Each school has its own faculty and is led by a dean appointed by the president and the provost with the consent of the Board of Trustees. The School of Arts and Sciences and the School of Engineering are the only schools that award both undergraduate and graduate degrees. The schools offering undergraduate education are the School of Arts and Sciences (the liberal arts college offering both the Bachelor of Arts and Bachelor of Science degree as well as the Bachelor of Fine Arts degree at the School of the Museum of Fine Arts), the School of Engineering (which offers the Bachelor of Science degree), and the School of Special Studies. The Jonathan M. Tisch College of Citizenship and Public Service and the Experimental College are non-degree granting.

The Tisch College was founded in 2000 "to educate for active citizenship" with the help of a $10 million gift from eBay founder Pierre Omidyar and his wife Pam. The school was renamed in 2006 after a $40 million gift from Jonathan Tisch. It has been called the "most ambitious attempt by any research university to make public service part of its core academic mission". The college facilitates and supports a wide range of community service, civic engagement programs, research, and teaching initiatives across the university. The university runs on a semester-based calendar with most undergraduate students finishing within four years, however, Tisch College provides an innovative 1+4 Bridge year program where students have the opportunity to take a community service-based gap year before starting in Tufts. Current projects undertaken by Bridge Year Fellows involve serving as mentors and teachers to children, caring for rescued wild animals, contributing to renewable energy and sustainability projects. Current projects are based in Brazil, Nicaragua, and Spain.

Under the purview of the School of Arts and Sciences is the Experimental College (or ExCollege), created in 1964 as a proving ground for innovative, experimental, and interdisciplinary curricula and courses. It offers the opportunity for students to take for-credit courses with non-academic practitioners in a variety of fields, and also from upper-level undergraduates who have a chance to design and teach their own courses. Another successful component of the Ex College is EPIIC, a year-long program begun in 1985 to immerse students in a global issue, which culminates in an annual symposium of scholars and experts from the field.

Graduate education is offered in eight of the schools. In addition to Arts and Sciences and Engineering, Tufts offers graduate degrees in the Fletcher School of Law and Diplomacy, the oldest U.S. school for international relations and foreign affairs, the School of Dental Medicine, the School of Medicine, the School of Biomedical Sciences, the Friedman School of Nutrition, and the Cummings School of Veterinary Medicine. Additionally, the university previously provided master's degrees in religion through the Crane Theological School. The school was dissolved in 1968.

Academics

Admissions

Undergraduate admissions

Tufts is one of the most selective colleges in the United States, with the Princeton Review giving it a selectivity rating of 98/99. In addition, U.S. News & World Report names Tufts' undergraduate admission as "most selective". For the class of 2026, Tufts admitted 9% of 34,880 applicants.  The number of places in the freshmen class is set at approximately 1,600 students. For the class of 2024, the interquartile range of SAT scores was 1420–1550 while for the ACT it was 33–35.

Since 2006 Tufts has incorporated experimental criteria into the application process for undergraduates to test "creativity and other non-academic factors", including inviting applicants to submit YouTube videos to supplement their application. Calling it the "first major university to try such a departure from the norm", Inside Higher Ed also notes that Tufts continues to consider the SAT and other traditional criteria.  Tufts accepts illegal immigrant students with and without Deferred Action for Childhood Arrivals (DACA). Undocumented students are not considered international students, but rather domestic students.

In 1856, shortly after Tufts opened, its admissions application asked for statements of good character and for students to complete examinations in Greek, history, Latin, and mathematics. As part of these examinations, they were asked to study a list of relevant textbooks. By 1905 the admissions requirements became lengthier, and the examinations became more complex; the latter required students to write essays and translations. Julia Ryan of The Atlantic wrote that because students certified by the New England College Entrance Certificate Board, ones who attended private preparatory schools in New England, were exempt from the examinations, "perhaps only a few students were even taking [the entrance examinations]." By 1925 Tufts set an admission quota of 650 males; the examinations were of a similar length of the 1905 ones but the entry requirements decreased in size to a level comparable of that of the 1856 ones. Standardized testing, admissions interviews, and other features of current university admissions processes were in place by 1946.

Graduate admissions
The graduate schools each hold their own admission process. Students apply directly to the graduate program to which they are seeking acceptance, and so acceptance rates vary between programs.

Rankings

In 2019, Forbes ranked Tufts 25th among research universities, 34th overall, and ranked the undergraduate school 29th among private colleges in its America's Top Colleges ranking, which includes 650 military academies, national universities, and liberal arts colleges.  Additionally, Vault.com's 2017 rankings placed Tufts' undergraduate school 25th in the nation. The 2014 Parchment student choice college rankings, which tracks enrollment decisions of 253,440 students who have been accepted to multiple schools in order to reveal their preference for their chosen school compared to the other schools that admitted the student, ranks Tufts as #17 nationally and #13 for national universities for student preference. According to U.S. News & World Reports 2022 college rankings, Tufts ranks 28th in the nation.  In 2017 high school guidance counselors ranked it tied for 23rd, and 173rd globally. In 2018, the Times Higher Education World University Rankings placed Tufts tied for 169th in the world. The university ranks in the No. 101-150 range in the 2015 Academic Ranking of World Universities and 238th in the 2018 QS World University Rankings. Additionally, for the class enrolling fall 2013, Forbes placed Tufts among the top 20 in "The Top 100 Colleges Ranked By SAT Scores". Tufts' peer schools according to U.S. News & World Report in 2015 include Columbia, University of Pennsylvania, Dartmouth, and Brown. Tufts University is accredited by the New England Commission of Higher Education.

Foreign Policy ranked Tufts' Fletcher School of Law and Diplomacy 4th in the world for International Relations in 2009. U.S. News & World Report for 2017 ranks Tufts tied for 58th for engineering among schools that grant PhD degrees, and also ranks Tufts' Medical School and Research Institute tied for 52nd in primary care and tied for 49th in research, while the School of Biomedical Sciences ranks 68th in their rankings of Best Graduate Schools, Biological Sciences. The Boston School of Occupational Therapy, an entry-level master's program within the Graduate School of Arts & Sciences at Tufts, ranks sixth in U.S. News & World Report Best Occupational Therapy Programs.  Tufts' MA program in philosophy ranks 1st in the United States in terms of faculty quality.

Tufts was named by Newsweek as one of the "25 New Ivies" in 2006. In The Princeton Review 2010–2011 "Best 363 Colleges", Tufts was ranked 14th for the happiest students and its study abroad program was ranked third in the country. According to the October 2010 rankings compiled by The Chronicle of Higher Education, Tufts ranked 12th in the country (tied with both Harvard and Johns Hopkins) with 17 Fulbright scholars. Tufts also ranks fourth among medium-sized schools for the number of Teach for America volunteers it produces. Because of its continual growth as an institution, Tufts was ranked as the fifth "hottest school" of the decade from 2000 to 2010. Tufts was ranked the 450th top college in the United States by Payscale and CollegeNet's Social Mobility Index college rankings.

Research

Tuft's research expenditure in fiscal year 2018 was $213.5 million.

Collaborations
Students can pursue a five-year program with the New England Conservatory. The Cosmology department also offers joint seminars with MIT. Organized by Alan Guth and Alexander Vilenkin, the seminars are open to all students. The Fletcher School also operates dual degree programs with Harvard Law School, Tuck School of Business at Dartmouth, UC Berkeley School of Law, among others. Several academic consortiums allow for research collaboration between local schools. Examples exist with the Program on Negotiation, the ROTC, the Tufts-New England Medical Center, the Center for European Studies, and the School of Engineering. Several exchange programs allow students to study at the Graduate Institute of International and Development Studies in Geneva and the Sciences Po in Paris. Cross registration exists for undergraduate students with schools in the Boston Consortium. Fletcher and other graduate students may cross register with the graduate schools at Harvard and MIT.

Tufts has offered study abroad programs with various universities for the past 40 years. Tufts has semester and year long programs with Pembroke College of the University of Oxford, University College London, Royal Holloway University of London, School of Oriental and African Studies, University of Paris, Sciences Po Paris, École nationale supérieure des Beaux-Arts, University of Tübingen, Zhejiang University, and University of Hong Kong. Every year more than 500 undergraduate students study abroad, with most doing it during their junior and senior years.

Archives, libraries, and museums

Completed in 1908, Tufts' first library building, Eaton Memorial Library (now Eaton Hall), was made possible with a donation from Andrew Carnegie. Carnegie's wife requested that the building be named after a Tufts graduate, Reverend Charles Eaton, who had presided over her wedding. The building received an extension in 1950 with the construction of the War Memorial Library in honor of the Tufts alumni who served in World War II. By 1965 the collection outgrew the building and was moved to a new library named Wessell Library. Additionally, the demand for more square footage prompted the expansion of Wessell.

Today the Tufts University Library System contains over three million volumes. The main library, Tisch Library, holds about 2.7 million volumes, with other holdings dispersed at subject libraries including the Hirsh Health Sciences Library on the Boston campus, the Edwin Ginn Library at the Fletcher School, and Webster Family Library at the Cummings School of Veterinary Medicine on the Grafton campus. Students have access to the academic libraries of institutions in the Boston Consortium. Tufts is also a member of SHARES, which allows students to have library access in participating members such as Brown, Columbia, Cornell, Caltech, Dartmouth, Johns Hopkins, Northwestern, Princeton, Stanford, UPenn and Yale. Furthermore, students may apply for privileges to Harvard's Library System. Tufts also runs the Perseus Project, a digital library project that assembles digital collections of humanities resources.

Digital Collections and Archives (DCA) is the archives and manuscript repository of Tufts University and is open to the public.

In addition to the Barnum Museum of Natural History, Tufts had established a permanent art collection which includes a wide range of art from antiquity to the present. The Collection comprises 2,000 works from ancient Mediterranean and pre-Hispanic cultures to modern and contemporary painting, sculpture, and photography. Notable highlights in the permanent collection include works by John Singer Sargent, Albrecht Dürer, Isamu Noguchi, Auguste Rodin, Andy Warhol, Milton Resnick, Salvador Dalí, and Pablo Picasso among others. Exhibitions of the collection rotate annually in the Aidekman Arts Center.

Student life

Student body
According to the Princeton Review the undergraduate student body is ethnically and socioeconomically diverse. The Advocate ranks Tufts as one of the top 20 gay-friendly campuses. Of those accepted for admission to the undergraduate Class of 2019, 27 percent are Asian, Hispanic, African American, or two or more races. There were 145 international students and 6 DACA students Of domestic students admitted, some 31 percent self-identified as one or more races other than Caucasian, including Asian Americans, African Americans, Hispanic Americans and Native Americans. International students make up 15 percent of the undergraduate student population. Students come from all 50 states and represent 71 countries. The top 10 countries represented are China, Greece, Hong Kong, India, Turkey, Singapore, Canada, South Korea, the United Kingdom, and Vietnam.

Student government
There are three forms of student government at Tufts University: The Tufts Community Union (TCU) Senate, the TCU Judiciary and the CSL (Committee on Student Life). The Senate is chaired by the student body president and led by a six-person executive board consisting of Vice President, Treasurer, Historian, Parliamentarian, and Diversity and Community Affairs Officer.

Publications and broadcasting
The Tufts Daily is the daily student newspaper, and the Tufts Observer, established in 1895, is the school's biweekly magazine and the oldest publication on campus. The Zamboni is Tufts' monthly humor and satire magazine. The Princeton Review has named Tufts' college newspaper as one of the best in the country, currently ranking it No. 10. Tufts has a television station (TUTV) which has produced and broadcast films, news, soap operas, and comedy sketch pieces. TUTV has also gone to release web series such as "Jules and Monty". The station went operational in April 1977, from Curtis Hall and consists of 40 student volunteers. Curtis Hall is also home to Tufts' own radio station WMFO, which streams locally on 91.5 FM. The station first aired in 1970 and is funded by the university.

Activism

In 1969, Tufts was the center for Civil Rights activism due to the controversy surrounding the construction of Lewis Hall. Students staged a work strike to protest racist hiring policies practiced by the construction company Tufts had commissioned to build the residence hall. In addition to writing letters, students sat in Ballou and East Halls, and collaborated with black workers. These demonstrations eventually attracted support from major metropolitan areas in the Northeast. In 1970, Tufts adopted new hiring policies which were subsequently adopted by other universities. It led to the creation of training programs for minority employees on campus, in addition to the foundation of the Africana Center.

Greek life
About 25% of the student body is involved in Greek life. The four national fraternities with active chapters at Tufts are Delta Tau Delta, Theta Chi, Zeta Beta Tau, and Zeta Psi. In addition, there are three sororities: Alpha Phi, Chi Omega, and Kappa Alpha Theta. There is one co-ed fraternity, ATO of Massachusetts, as well. The university has also been home to historically Black and cultural interest Greek-lettered organizations as well, such as Alpha Phi Alpha and Lambda Upsilon Lambda.

Athletics

Tufts competes in the New England Small College Athletic Conference—the NESCAC—in NCAA Division III. Their mascot is Jumbo, which is one of two college mascots to appear in Webster's Dictionary with the other being the Billiken of St. Louis University. The mascot comes from P. T. Barnum's circus, as Barnum was one of the original trustees of Tufts College. According to legend, Jumbo the Elephant heroically jumped in front of a train, sacrificing himself to save a younger elephant from dying. Jumbo's stuffed skin was donated to the school and was displayed until a 1975 fire destroyed the body, except for the tail, which had been removed for conservation work. Now, a statue of the elephant is a prominent landmark on the quad, near Barnum Hall, the Biology building. Some of Jumbo's ashes were recovered in a peanut butter jar that has remained in the athletics director's office where students continue to rub it for good luck.

Recently, Tufts has become one of the top athletic schools in Division III. The school has consistently ranked in the top ten of the Learfield Director's Cup, which ranks the top Division I, II, and III athletic programs in the country by awarding points in a pre-determined number of sports for men and women. In 2022, Tufts won the Learfield Director's Cup. In 2015–16, Tufts ranked 4th in the country, and in 2014–15 Tufts ranked 9th. Tufts men's lacrosse team won the school's first ever NCAA team championship in 2010, beating Salisbury State University in the championship game. They lost in 2011 to Salisbury in the championship. In 2012, the women's field hockey team won their first national championship, beating Montclair State University 2–1 in the finals. Coach Tina McDavitt won DIII National Coach of the Year in 2012, as well. The field hockey team had previously been national runners-up in 2008. The women's softball team won three consecutive NCAA Division III National Championships in 2013, 2014 and 2015. The men's lacrosse team won their second NCAA Division III National Championship in 2014 and their third Championship in 2015, beating Lynchburg. On December 6, 2014, the men's soccer team won its first-ever DIII National Championship, defeating Wheaton College 4–2. The Jumbos repeated this feat two years later, winning the DIII National Championship in 2016 by defeating Calvin College 1–0. The men's and women's squash teams have been historically successful, ranking within the top 30 teams in the nation. The Men's Varsity Swim and Dive team won the first NESCAC Championship in school history in 2018 and the team placed 7th in the nation at the National Championship meet that same year.

Tufts also fields a team of runners each year for the Boston Marathon, raising money for the Friedman School's research initiatives. Originally an initiative started by then President Larry Bacow as the Presidential Marathon Challenge, it has been continued by President Monaco.  At one time Tufts was granted 200 race bibs a year and students, alumni, and other affiliates would be trained by Coach Donald Megerle from the Fall until the day itself, the current number of bibs per year is 50. Many of the runners are first-time marathoners, and it is tradition for participants to wear their Boston Marathon medals at graduation.

Performed at most football games, "Tuftonia's Day", the Tufts fight song, was written in 1912 by Elliot W. Hayes. It can also be heard at Tufts' numerous a capella concerts and at homecoming.

Housing and dining

Seven out of ten undergraduates live on campus. Students can choose from 40 residences from small special interest houses to traditional dorms, to shared apartments. There are 25 residence halls. Similar to residential colleges, students would frequently organize discussions and bring in guest speakers and plan several activities together. Upperclassmen have the option of living in special interest housing which are 15 houses reflecting a specific cultural or academic interest. Each house offers organizes several activities and events not limited to residents. Shared apartments are usually the most popular in the university with apartments like Sophia Gordon Hall (SoGo) a primary gathering place for juniors and seniors. The high-density residential neighborhood around the university provides additional housing for students who opt to live off campus.

The university has two main dining centers, Dewick-MacPhie serving downhill students, and Carmichael serving uphill students. Each dining hall has a different menu and atmosphere. Both offer a European style server with multiple stations. The Princeton Review has listed Tufts in its "Best Campus Food" category since 2005, ranking it as high as second. In addition to the two main dining centers, there are a variety of smaller cafes, including a Kosher Deli and Hodgdon Food-To-Go which offers students a place to grab a quick bite to go.

Traditions

A Cappella
Tufts also has a thriving a cappella scene, including the Beelzebubs, known for their performances on NBC's The Sing-Off and Glee, where the group arranged several of the songs performed by the fictional a cappella group The Warblers. Other notable groups include the Amalgamates, known also for their performances all over the United States, and the Jackson Jills, Tufts' oldest female group.

Naked Quad Run
Every winter just prior to final exams, students would run naked laps on the Academic Quad as a way to relieve the stress of finals, much akin to similar traditions such as the Primal Scream at Harvard. Due to increasing scrutiny from the administration and injuries incurred by slipping on the icy roads, the tradition was banned in 2011 by then-President Lawrence Bacow, much to students' dismay. A protest run took place the following year, with some students donning nude colored leotards and others taking the opposite tack calling their event the "Excessively Overdressed Quad Stroll". Starting in 2016, the tradition was revitalized for spring finals week and briefly became an annual tradition once more.

JumboSmash 
JumboSmash is an application built from scratch every year by students in the computer science department. The idea has its origins in a 2012 submission to a Tufts hackathon. Several students involved in its creation described it as "a localized, college-seniors-only Tinder app" available during the week before graduation. The 2017 iteration registered 1 million swipes in the first 24 hours. Per tradition, the developers delete the app at the end of senior week, and the next year's group starts from scratch.

Notable people

Tufts alumni in the government sector include Admiral James Stavridis, former dean of The Fletcher School at Tufts University and former Commander of Southern Command and Supreme Allied Commander of NATO (MALD. 1983, PhD 1984); Mulatu Teshome Wirtu (MALD 1990), President of Ethiopia from 2013 to 2018; Kostas Karamanlis (MA 1982, PhD 1984), former Prime Minister of Greece; Shashi Tharoor (MA 1976, MALD. 1977, PhD 1979), former United Nations Under-Secretary General and Indian Member of Parliament; Arjun Narasingha KC (Post-graduate Fellowship in International Diplomacy), former Health, Education and Urban Development Minister of Nepal; Daniel Patrick Moynihan (BA 1948, MA 1949, PhD 1961), former-US Senator from New York and US Ambassador to the United Nations; Scott Brown (BA 1981), former-US Senator from Massachusetts; Bill Richardson (BA 1970), former-Governor of New Mexico, US Secretary of Energy and US Ambassador to the United Nations; Thomas R. Pickering (MA 1954), diplomat; Joseph Dunford (MA 1992), Chairman of the Joint Chiefs of Staff; Peter DeFazio (BA 1969), Democratic United States Representative from Oregon; and Dan Crenshaw, former Navy SEAL, recipient of two Bronze Stars, and a current US Representative for the state of Texas.

Graduates who have found success in business include Pierre Omidyar (BS 1988), eBay founder; Laura Lang (BA 1977), CEO of Time Inc; Jamie Dimon (BA 1978), CEO of JPMorgan Chase; John Bello (BA 1968), SoBe Beverages founder; Jeff Kindler (BA 1977), former CEO of Pfizer; Jonathan Tisch (BA 1976), CEO of Loews Hotels; Ellen J. Kullman (BA 1978), CEO of DuPont; and Anthony Scaramucci (BA 1986), Cofounder of SkyBridge Capital and Former Director of Communications for the Trump Administration, Seth Godin (BS 1982), bestselling author and founder of Squidoo.

In media, alumni include David Faber (BA 1985), anchor at CNBC; Meredith Vieira (BA 1975), journalist and TV personality; Arthur Ochs Sulzberger, Jr. (BA 1974), publisher of The New York Times; Peter Roth (BA 1972), CEO of Warner Bros. Television; and Josh Gates, TV host and producer. In the arts, alumni include William Hurt (BA 1972), Academy Award-winning actor; Hank Azaria (BA 1988), actor and voice actor; Peter Gallagher (BA 1977), actor; Tracy Chapman (BA 1987), singer-songwriter; Deke Sharon (BA 1991), a cappella musician; Darin Strauss (BA 1992), National Book Critics Circle Award-winning author; Ruben Bolling (real name Ken Fisher) (BA 1984), cartoonist and writer; and Gregory Maguire (PhD 1990), novelist.

Other alumni include Michelle Kwan (MA 2011), Olympic medalist and World Champion figure skater from the United States; Frederick Hauck (BA 1962), spacecraft commander of the Space Shuttle Discovery; Rear Admiral Leo Otis Colbert (BS 1907), the third Director of the United States Coast and Geodetic Survey; and Thelma C. Swain (BA 1931), Maine philanthropist, Edwin Ginn, a Tufts alumnus (1862) and founder of the World Peace Foundation.

Notable people who matriculated but did not complete their degrees include actress Jessica Biel, actor Rainn Wilson, American Apparel founder Dov Charney, and country music singer songwriter Darrell Scott. 

Current and former Tufts faculty include former American Psychological Association president Robert Sternberg; Pulitzer Prize-winning historian Martin J. Sherwin; philosopher Daniel Dennett; Nobel Laureate Allan M. Cormack; Nobel Laureate Paul Samuelson; Nobel Laureate Wassily Leontief; Nobel Laureate Mohamed ElBaradei; Nobel Laureate Rainer Weiss; Daniel W. Drezner, regular featured columnist in Foreign Policy Magazine; radio host Lonnie Carton; Japanese author Haruki Murakami; and author Lee Edelman.

See also 

 The Edward R. Murrow Forum on Issues in Journalism
 The Fletcher Forum of World Affairs
 PRAXIS: The Fletcher Journal of Human Security
 Tufts Historical Review
 Tuftsin
 Tufts Jumbos football
 Tufts Daily
 Tufts Magazine
 Tufts Observer
 Tufts OpenCourseWare
 Tufts Pass
 University Press of New England

Notes

References

Further reading 
 Sol Gittleman: An Entrepreneurial University: The Transformation of Tufts, 1976–2002, Tufts University Press, 2002, 
 Diversity, Resiliency, Legacy: The Lives of Adult Students at Tufts University, ed. by Jean Hebert and Tina Marie Johnson, Tufts University Press, 2008,

External links 

 
 Tufts Athletics website
 

 
Buildings and structures in Medford, Massachusetts
Buildings and structures in Somerville, Massachusetts
Educational institutions established in 1852
Somerville, Massachusetts
Private universities and colleges in Massachusetts
Universities and colleges in Middlesex County, Massachusetts
1852 establishments in Massachusetts
Universalist Church of America